Genoa River is a perennial river located in the Monaro region of New South Wales and flows into the East Gippsland region of Victoria in Australia. It used to be known as Bondi Creek or Yard Creek. The river's name derives from the First People "jinoor" ("footpath").

Course and features
Genoa River rises below Nungatta Mountain, south of Bombala in New South Wales, and flows generally north, then south, crossing the Black-Allan Line that forms part of the border between Victoria and New South Wales, and then southeast flowing through the Coopracambra National Park, joined by fifteen tributaries including the White Rock River and Wallagaraugh River, before reaching its river mouth of the Tasman Sea of the South Pacific Ocean at the Mallacoota Inlet in Victoria. The river descends  over its  course.

The Monaro Highway crosses the river in its upper reaches between Bombala and Cann River; and the Princes Highway crosses the river in its lower reaches at Genoa.

See also

 Rivers of New South Wales
 List of rivers of New South Wales (A–K)
 List of rivers of Australia

References

External links
 
 
 
 

 

East Gippsland catchment
Rivers of Gippsland (region)
Rivers of New South Wales